The Damuan class is a ship class of two utility landing craft. Both were laid down by Cheverton Workboats in Cowes, England for the Royal Brunei Navy. The lead ship is KDB Damuan. Currently both ships are in active service in support of Royal Brunei Land Forces. Damuan was  commissioned in 1976 while Puni was commissioned in 1977 in Muara Naval Base, Brunei.

On 11 September 2007, a total of 50 groups consisting of the youths of Kg Menangah Mosque and Bukit Sulang Tutong District made a study visit to the Royal Brunei Navy Base. The purpose of the group to make the visit to know about the duties and responsibilities and role of Navy and then given the opportunity to board and do their prayers on KDB Punis deck.

Ship in class

References 

Royal Brunei Navy
Amphibious warfare vessels
Landing craft